Mark Foy's Limited or Mark Foy's was a department store in Sydney, New South Wales, Australia, founded by Francis Foy and his brother Mark Foy. The department store was named after their father, Mark Foy (senior), and traded between 1885 and 1980.

Trading history
After first establishing their store on Oxford Street in 1885, the Foy brothers opened  'Mark Foy's Piazza Store  in 1909 on Liverpool Street. This was a three-storey store (two floors plus basement) designed by architects Arthur McCredie & Arthur Anderson with a turreted mansard roof. The building was partially modelled on the Parisian Le Bon Marche department store. Its piazza, chandeliers, marble, and sumptuous ballroom made it a Sydney institution and one of Australia's foremost fashion stores. The store had Australia's first escalator. The store stretched around a whole city block and gave rise to the colloquial saying, when referring to a person of overweening confidence, "You've got more front than Mark Foy's." The store was remodelled in 1927. The store was linked in 1926 to the newly opened Museum Railway Station by underground subway.

The company had its most profitable year in 1954/1955. With the decline of the Liverpool street area in the 1950s and 1960s, Mark Foys began to experience financial decline declaring its first financial loss in 1966/1967.

A store was opened at Rockdale in 1963 in the Southside Plaza (now Rockdale Plaza). The Rockdale store was extensively damaged by fire in 1967. Rebuilt, it became a McDowells store and then was rebranded as Waltons in 1972. In 1964 Mark Foy's opened a store in the Sydney suburb of Eastwood and in 1966 at Burwood in the Burwood Westfield Shopping Town. The Eastwood Store became a McDowells store and then a Waltons.  Other stores were opened across Sydney's suburbs at Chatswood, Northbridge, Double Bay, Bankstown, Bondi Junction Plaza, Pymble, Spit Junction, Roselands Shopping Centre, and Canberra, as well as in Centrepoint, on 252 George Street as well as its mid-city attempt on King Street elsewhere in Sydney's central business district.

In 1968 Mark Foy's was taken over by McDowells Holding Ltd. In 1972, McDowells was in turn acquired by Waltons. After Waltons was split in 1987, six stores were sold to George Bloomfield of Australian clothing manufacturer Wraggs. The stores still trading as Mark Foys, were sold again to Clothing retailer Richards in November 1986.

In 1980, when it ceased trading after going into receivership, the City Piazza building briefly became "Grace Bros Piazza" until 1982. The natural shift of the retailing hub further north of the CBD, around Pitt Street Mall, led to its closure.

The City Piazza building is now used as a complex of state courthouses known as the Downing Centre. However, its former role is preserved in the ornate tilework on the facade and surroundings. The Mark Foy's warehouse is a heritage brownstone building located on nearby Goulburn Street, which has been converted into residential apartments known as Sydney Mansions.

Ice skating rink

An ice skating rink was installed on the fifth floor of the store as part of a Swiss alpine setting for the presentation of skating costumes and evening gowns. The miniature rink opened at lunchtime on 11 April 1950 for the fashion parade titled "Fashion Fantasy On Ice", which would have a duration of 10 days. There was the prospect of customers being able to use the miniature ice rink.

Mark Foys and sectarianism
It is claimed that the Foy family, Irish-born Roman Catholics, would only employ Catholics and stocked uniforms of the major Catholic schools, in an environment when government organisations had a policy to not employ Catholics, and David Jones specialised in Anglican school uniforms.

Other business interests
Mark Foy also founded the Hydro Majestic Hotel at Medlow Bath near Katoomba, and Australia's oldest open-boat sailing club, the Sydney Flying Squadron, founded in 1891. The department store's family is well known for the "infamously believed murdered" heiress Juanita Nielsen of whom the store's family connections with the green newspaper NOW were the result of her modelling career there in 1953-54 and the loggerheads campaign against the takeover of Mark Foy's by McDowell's in the 1960s, of which the success of this led to her relocation to the notorious Kings Cross area, where she used her newspaper to campaign against the unwelcome high-rise dream in working-class Victoria Street of which led to disappearance "believed murdered" on Friday 4 July 1975. This ensuing cold case left another - one of a post-legacy - for Mark Foy's department store empire in the city, meaning that only stage 1 of this "high-rise developer's dream" was only ever achieved for Victoria Street, Kings Cross and the symbol of the little guys standing up to the big world is in the form of another heritage-listed building (her house) for the enduring Foy family legacy (with the heritage-listed "Piazza" Mark Foy's store in the form of the Downing Centre courthouse).

Gallery

See also

 Foy & Gibson

References

External links
 

Defunct department stores of Australia
Companies based in Sydney
Castlereagh Street, Sydney
Liverpool Street, Sydney
Elizabeth Street, Sydney
Retail companies established in 1885
Retail companies disestablished in 1980